Te-tsun Yü (1908–1986) was a Chinese botanist, specialising in Spermatophytes and Phanerogams, particularly in the Yunnan and Sichuan provinces of China, which have the most diverse flora in China.

Education 
Yu was taught by Hu Xiansu.

Career 
Yu was a co-founder of the Kunming Institute of Botany. He worked as editor of the Flora Reipublicae Popularis Sinicae and director of the Institute of Botany at the Chinese Academy of Sciences.

He was a prolific collector of plant specimens in Yunnan, making expeditions into the largely unexplored mountains in the north west of the province. Thousands of specimens he collected were exported to Arnold Arboretum in Boston, Massachusetts and Royal Botanic Garden Edinburgh who funded the expeditions in 1937.

In 1979 he toured the United States as part of a delegation from the Botanical Society of the People's Republic of China in reciprocal arrangements with the Botanical Society of America. This collaboration led to the Flora of China Project which started shortly after Yu's death and was first published in 1994.

He compiled "The Botanical Gardens of China" (Published: 1983 by Science Press, Beijing) which contains many colour photographs and maps of each botanical garden.

References

External links
 http://flora.huh.harvard.edu/china/index.html Flora of China Project

20th-century Chinese botanists
Chinese gardeners
Chinese taxonomists
Beijing Normal University alumni
1908 births
1986 deaths
Biologists from Beijing
Members of the Jiusan Society